Antonio Nieto (born September 1967)  is an Earth Systems and Mining Engineer.

Career
Prof. Dr. Nieto is Director of the FLSmidth Mining and Minerals Technology and Research Center located in Salt Lake City, USA. Prior to his academic and research career Nieto worked as a mining engineer in underground mining and surface mining.

Nieto graduated as mining engineer from Guanajuato School of Mines in 1990. He holds a master's degree (1997) in Geostatistics from Ecole Des Mines de Paris (Paris Tech), and a MS (1995) and PhD (2002) in Earth-Systems Engineering from Colorado School of Mines. He was nominated in 2017 as member of the Mexico's National Academy of Engineering.

Nieto specializes in ore resource and reserve estimation and mining operations optimization. He is often interviewed by news networks on mine safety and technology news. , and often advises university grad-research teams such as Harvard in the United States and Cambridge in the UK, on topics such as "The 'critical role that the mining industry will play in powering future economic growth', and 'The role of sustainable extraction and processing of critical minerals in driving the current tech energy transition'

Nieto has published more than 80 technical papers.  His publications include, "An Innovation Straregy for the Mine of the Future", a book chapter on "Underground Mine Design" (SME Mining Engineering Handbook 2011), "Supply and demand analysis of rare-earths",  "Assessment tools, prevailing issues, and policy implications of sustainability in China mining-communities",  "Comparison of typical regulatory mechanisms for improving global mine safety",  "Key deposit indicators and key ore-extraction indicators in mineral extraction", "Risk assessment of safety violations for coal mines", "GPS and google-earth systems in surface mines", "Effects of legislation on mine safety technology and innovation in the USA" and more. The complete list of Dr. Nieto's publications is available

See also
School of Mines
Antonio Nieto

References

External links
 https://web.archive.org/web/20151222081411/http://www.antonionieto.com/

Mining engineers
1967 births
Living people
Pennsylvania State University faculty